Beginning on 14 May 2016, a low pressure area over the Bay of Bengal caused torrential rain to fall across Sri Lanka, causing floods and landslides which affected half a million people. As of 25 May 2016 the death toll was 101 with 100 missing.

Events
On 14 May 2016 the Meteorology Department issued a severe weather advisory for twelve hours commencing 11:30 IST. Up to 100mm of rain was expected in parts of eastern and southern Sri Lanka with wind speeds up to 70-80 kmh at sea.

15 May
A depression off south-east Sri Lanka caused torrential rain and minor floods. Nearly 100mm of rainfall was reported in Avissawella, Hambantota and Kurunegala and several parts of the capital Colombo were flooded. Seas off Mannar and Trincomalee were expected to be rough. The National Building Research Organization (NBRO) issued landslide and cut slope failure warnings for the Badulla, Bandarawela, Ella, Haliela, Hadummulla, Haputale, Lunugala, Passara, Uva-Paranagama and Welimada areas.

More than 35 families in Nalluruwa were displaced after a gale hit their homes. Bad weather forced two flights bound for Bandaranaike International Airport (BIA) to be diverted to Cochin International Airport. A landslide in Hattota near Dehiowita in Kegalle District left four dead and one missing.

Between 8.30 am to 5.30pm 137.7mm of rain was recorded in Katunayake, 125.7mm in Trincomalee, 117.2mm in Kurunegala, 106.9mm in Colombo, 98mm in Mahailuppallama, 93.5mm in Ratnapura, 79. mm in Kandy and 74.7 mm in Batticaloa.

16 May
A flight bound for BIA was diverted to Mattala Rajapaksa International Airport due to bad weather. With water levels on the Attanagalu Oya, Kalu Ganga, Kelani River, Maha Oya, Mahaweli River, Nilwala Ganga and Yan Oya rising, the Disaster Management Center (DMC) warned people living on river banks and low-lying areas in Badalgama, Dunamale, Giriulla, Hanwella, Horowpatana, Nawalapitiya, Panadugama, Peradeniya, and Ratnapura to be vigilant. The Meteorology Department advised that the low pressure area was moving away from Sri Lanka's rainfall would subside though heavy winds and showers would continue for a few days. Power failures were reported in several villages. Flights leaving Ratmalana Airport were grounded due to heavy rain. The Southern Expressway's exit at Biyagama was closed due to flooding.

Heavy rains and floods affected Chilaw, Colombo, Galle, Kalutara, Kandy, Kegalle, Matara, Nuwara Eliya and Ratnapura and one person was killed by lightning in Anuradhapura. The Sri Lanka Air Force (SLAF) rescued fishermen off Pitipana near Negombo in Gampaha District after their boat capsized.

According to the DMC the death toll stood at three and more than 11,000 people were affected.

17 May
A landslide in Ilukkwatta near Kadugannawa in Kandy District buried two homes under 25 feet of mud, rock and rubble, killing seven. The Road Development Authority waived Tolls on the Southern Expressway between Kottawa to Kadawatha due to the weather. Schools in Central Province, North Western Province, Sabaragamuwa Province and Western Province are closed due to the floods.

Over 200 people trapped by flooding in Thabbowa in Puttalam District were rescued by the SLAF and Sri Lanka Navy. A landslide in Samsarakanda near Aranayaka in Kegalle District buried several homes, killing 21 and leaving 123 missing. The villages of Elangapitiya, Pallebage and Siripura were buried in the landslide. A landslide at Kalupahana Estate near Bulathkohupitiya in Kegalle District buried several homes, killing 14 and leaving two missing.

According to the DMC the death toll stood at eight with another eight missing and more than 200,000 people were affected.

18 May
The Sri Lanka Army, with the help of villagers, volunteers and medical staff, began rescue efforts at Aranayaka and Bulathkohupitiya. Two boys were killed in Wattala due to the floods. The Outer Circular Expressway was flooded at Kaduwela. With roads underwater and impassable, the Wilpattu National Park was closed until 25 May 2016.

As water levels on the Kelani River rose rapidly, the DMC warned those living near its banks to move to safety. The Ceylon Electricity Board imposed emergency power cuts on the Colombo suburbs of Kohilawatte, Kolonnawa, Kotikawatte, Orugodawatta, Sedawatta, Sinhapura and Wellampitiya as a precautionary measure. Overnight the army and navy evacuated 26,000 people affected by the floods in Colombo.

According to the Meteorology Department the last four days had seen one of the highest rainfalls in Sri Lanka. 373.3mm of rain fell on Kilinochchi in the 24 hours to 8.30 a.m. on 16 May 2016. Pottuvil recorded the highest rainfall on 15 May 2016 (145.8mm) whilst the highest rainfall on 17 May 2016 (267.8mm) was in Mahailukpallama. 135mm of rain fell on Kalepitimulla in the 24 hours to 8.30 a.m. on 18 May 2016.

According to the DMC the death toll stood at 37 with 155 missing.

Aftermath
Water levels on the Kelani River, which had peaked at 8 feet, began to fall slowly on 19 May 2016 and had fallen to six feet by 22 May 2016. All schools in the country were closed on 20 May 2016. Two people were killed in Ambulgama near Hanwella on 20 May 2016 after the boat they were in capsized in flood waters. A landslide was reported in Kabaragalakanda near Aranayake on 21 May 2016.

Prior to the floods Sri Lanka was suffering a drought and consequently power cuts as reservoirs ran dry. Following the floods water levels in many of the reservoirs reached 75%, giving uninterrupted power supply according to the Ministry of Power and Energy.

As rescue efforts continued the death toll increased. On 19 May 2016 the DMC gave the death toll as 58 with 132 missing. On 20 May 2016 the DMC gave the death toll as 64 with 131 missing. ON 21 May 2016 the DMC gave the death toll as 73 with 127 missing. Early on 22 May 2016 the death toll was given as 82 with 118 missing. Later on 22 May 2016 the death toll was given as 92 with 109 missing.

Government response
The Sri Lanka Army deployed more than 1500 Army personnel and 71 officers, including Commandos in worst-affected areas across the country for immediate search, rescue and relief operations and the Army on the directions of the Commander has organized another emergency contingent to stand by in case the situation worsens. The Sri Lanka Air Force dispatched Bell 212, Bell 412 and Mi 17 helicopters for rescue operations and providing of relief aid to victims. The Sri Lanka Navy dispatched 81 flood relief teams in areas such as Thalduwa, Hanwella, Ranala, Navagamuwa, Malwana, Kegalle, Kaduwela, Mulleriyawa, Dompe, Pugoda, Wellampitiya, Kollonnawa, Biyagama, Kotikawatta, Angoda, Kelanimulla, Vavunia, Vilachchiya and Mandagalaru to promptly engage in any adverse situation. Besides 40 more flood relief teams are kept on standby covering all the areas affected by floods to meet any emergency situation.

Unable to cope with the extent of the floods, the Sri Lankan government appealed for international assistance.

International response

 — On 20 May, the Commonwealth Secretary-General Patricia Scotland expressed her profound on the victims of landslides in Sri Lanka, following the heavy rain.
 — Australian Foreign Minister Julie Bishop promised to provide any assistance to Sri Lankan government following the damages from landslides and floods. Australia has offered to contribute $500,000 to UNICEF for humanitarian assistance such as the provision of clean water and sanitation for children in shelters.
 — Indian Prime Minister Narendra Modi pledged Sri Lanka to provide assistance in dealing with the disaster which caused by cyclone Roanu. On 20 May the Indian Navy ships INS Sunayna and INS Sutlej arrived in Colombo with relief material. A flight from India arrived at BIA on 21 May carrying humanitarian aid.
 — A flight from Japan arrived at BIA on 21 May carrying emergency relief items such as blankets, generators, water purifiers and water tanks.
 — Nepal has offered $100,000 towards the relief operation.
 — Pakistan has said that it will send a 30-bed field hospital and relief materials.
 — On 23 May, the Singapore Red Cross announced that it will distribute  in relief items to survivors, and has a team on standby to assist in relief work.
 — The United Nations Office for the Coordination of Humanitarian Affairs has said that it and international NGOs were helping the Sri Lankan government with relief efforts on the ground.
 — The United States Embassy in Colombo announced on 20 May that Rs.7.2 million (US$50,000) would be provided for immediate emergency relief items such as blankets, clothing, hygiene kits and mattresses whilst a three-year program totaling Rs.144 million (US$1 million) would provide safe, disaster-resilient drinking water for populations highly vulnerable to flooding and droughts.

References

Sri Lanka
Floods
Floods in Sri Lanka
Sri Lanka
Kegalle 2016
Tropical cyclones in Sri Lanka
May 2016 events in Asia
2016 disasters in Sri Lanka